Martin Bendík (born April 27, 1993 in Poprad, Slovakia) is an alpine skier from Slovakia. He competed for Slovakia at the 2014 Winter Olympics in the alpine skiing events.

References

1993 births
Living people
Olympic alpine skiers of Slovakia
Alpine skiers at the 2014 Winter Olympics
Sportspeople from Poprad
Slovak male alpine skiers